Joy Michael (1927-2018) was an Indian theatre personality and the co-founder of Yatrik, a repertory company based in Delhi. The Government of India honored her in 2012, with the fourth highest civilian award of Padma Shri.

Biography
Joy Michael, born in Asansol West Bengal, secured a post graduate degree in English literature from the St. Stephen's College, Delhi where she became the secretary of the Shakespeare Society, reported to be the first woman secretary, and a member of the Supreme Council of the college. Later she went to London and did graduate studies in Speech and Drama at the London Academy of Music and Dramatic Art and theatre training at the British Drama League. After working in the professional theatre in London for a while, she returned to India to continue her theatre activities in Delhi. Principal of St.Thomas School, Mandir Marg, New Delhi.

In 1964, Michael, along with Roshan Seth, Rati Bartholomew, Sushma Seth and Marcus Murch, founded Yatrik, a theatre group based in Delhi. She has remained the Director of the group for 40 years, during which period the group collaborated with many theatre personalities such as Alyque Padamsee, Ebrahim Alkazi, Barry John, Kulbhushan Kharbanda, Sinia Duggal, Madhuri Bhatia, Salima Raza, Kusum Haidar, Tejeshwar Singh, Bhaskar Bhattacharya, Lola Chatterjee, Sunit Tandon, Avijit Dutt and Prakash Bhatia at different times.

Joy Michael has worked with the United States-India Educational Foundation as an executive and has lectured at the University of Washington, Virginia and the Panjab University. Later, she joined St. Thomas' School, Delhi as its Principal and worked there for 15 years. She has also worked as an educational consultant to many schools managed by the Diocese of the Church of North India in Delhi, Shimla, Mussoorie and Assam. She has served as an executive council member of the World Communion of Reformed Churches. She has alo been an active member and on the executive committee of The Y.W.C.A (young women's christian association) of India.

Joy Michael is reported to have collaborated with over 200 plays, as writer or director and has also prepared plays for the television and the radio. She is married to Colonel Hughbert Michael and the couple has two daughters, Meriel and Kristine. and two grandchildren, Joy Indu Michael and Arnav John Hugh Michael.

Awards and recognitions
Joy Michael, holder of the title of Emeritus Theatre Director awarded by the Ministry of Culture, Government of India, is a recipient of Sangeet Natak Akademi Award which she received in 2009 for theatre direction. She has also received the Sahitya Kala Parishad Award, Delhi Natya Sangh Award, Rockefeller Award, Chamanlal Memorial Society Award and the Raja Ram Mohan Nation Education Award. In 2012, the Government of India included her in the Republic day honours list for the award of Padma Shri.

See also

 St. Stephen's College, Delhi
 London Academy of Music and Dramatic Art
 Church of North India
 World Communion of Reformed Churches

References

Further reading

External links
 
. http://indianexpress.com/article/cities/delhi/theatre-director-joy-michael-dies-at-92-5093515/.
 http://www.business-standard.com/article/news-ians/the-magical-joy-michael-tribute-118031100191_1.html

1927 births
2018 deaths
Recipients of the Padma Shri in arts
Recipients of the Sangeet Natak Akademi Award
People from Delhi
Indian theatre directors
St. Stephen's College, Delhi alumni
Alumni of the London Academy of Music and Dramatic Art